Mathruka Kudumbam is a 1982 Indian Malayalam film, directed by M. Krishnan Nair.

Cast

References

External links
 

1982 films
1980s Malayalam-language films
Films directed by M. Krishnan Nair